Seyyed Ahmad Hatef Esfahani (also Romanized as Hatif Isfahani and Hātif Isfahāni) was a famous Iranian poet of the 18th century.

Life
Hatef Esfahani was born in Isfahan (Esfahan), a central province of Iran, and most likely he died there in 1783. (Some documents also indicate that he died in 1777). Hatef's date of birth is unknown. He was contemporary to at least seven rulers of Iran, namely Shah Rukh of Persia (ruled 1748–1796), Karim Khan Zand (r. 1760–1779), Abolfath Khan, Mohammad Ali Khan, Sadiq Khan Zand, and Ali Murad Khan (all from Zand dynasty who ruled 1779–1785), and Agha Mohammad Khan, the founder of Qajar dynasty (r. 1781–1797). He studied mathematics, medicine, philosophy, literature, and foreign languages (Turkish and Arabic). He had a son and a daughter. His daughter, named Beygom, married poet Mirza Ali Akbar Naziri.

Poems
Hatef was an expert in the composition of ghazals (odes). A ghazal is a poem of complex structure and exalted by lyrical or rhapsodic mood on some stated theme. Another line of his profession was in the writing of tarji'-band poems. When the linking verse is recurrent, the poem is called a tarji'-band (literally: return-tie). But when the linking verse is varied, the poem is called a tarkib-band (literally: Composite-Tie). He was also skilful in the composition of qasidas, elegies (sugnameh), rubaiyat (quatrains) and fragments (qita'at). But his reputation lay in his excellent poems of a mystical nature.

Hatef has been considered one of the great Iranian mystic poets who taught many peoples about the higher aspects of the human existence and the journey of the soul. Hatef's poems are smooth, clear and flowing and free of ambiguities. He followed Saadi and Hafez especially in the composition of his odes. Due to his excellent odes, Hatef is also very well known in many parts of Europe and particularly in Italy.

Hatef also wrote three odes in Arabic. In two of his odes, he was inspired by the poems attributed to Urvah ibn Hazam Ozri, Jamil ibn Ozri and Umar ibn Abirabia. In the third ode, which is a eulogy of the Prophet, he was inspired by the poems composed by Fallera and Bursiri. Hatef's Poetry Anthology (in Persian: Divan-e-Hatef-e-Esfahani) was firstly edited and published in Tehran in 1953 by late poet and scholar Hassan Vahid Dastgerdi (Dastjerdi), the founder of the literary journal Gift (in Persian: Armaghan).

See also

 List of Persian poets and authors
 Persian literature

References
 "A Research Note on Poet Hatef Isfahani" by Dr Manouchehr Saadat Noury 
 "Christ and Christianity in Persian Poetry" By Hassan Dehqani-Tafti

External links
Iranica article 
Encyclopaedia of Islam, THREE
Poems of Hatef Esfahani as sung by Javad Zabihi 
Poem če šavad be čehre-ye zard-e man sung by Mohammad-Reza Shajarian
Article by Gen'ichi Tsuge (1970) with musical transcription of song če šavad (JStor)
Recital of Hatef's Tarji'-band by Dr Iraj Shahbazi. (Begins at 4:05)

Sufi poets
18th-century deaths
Year of birth unknown
18th-century Iranian poets
Writers from Isfahan
Persian Arabic-language poets
People of the Zand dynasty